National Highway 320 (NH 320) is a  National Highway in India. This runs entirely in the state of Jharkhand.

References

National highways in India
National Highways in Jharkhand